"Yo Te Lo Dije" is a song by Colombian singer J Balvin. The song was released digitally on March 15, 2012.

Track listing

Charts

Weekly charts

Year-end charts

Certifications

See also 
 List of number-one songs of 2012 in Colombia

References

2012 singles
J Balvin songs
Number-one singles in Colombia
2012 songs
Spanish-language songs
Reggaeton songs
Capitol Latin singles
Songs written by J Balvin